James Lucas may refer to:

 James Lucas (hermit) (1813–1874), English Victorian eccentric and hermit 
 James Lucas (screenwriter), New Zealand screenwriter and producer
 James Lucas (illustrator), British artist
 James C. Lucas (1912–1998), American criminal, took part in an attempted escape from Alcatraz Penitentiary in 1938
 James Lucas (bishop) (1867–1938), Anglican bishop
 James P. Lucas (born 1927), American politician in the state of Montana
 James Steve Lucas (born 1952), Canadian Forces Air Command general
 Jim G. Lucas (1914–1970), war correspondent for Scripps-Howard Newspapers
 Jay Lucas (James Howle Lucas, born 1957), American politician and attorney
 Jim Lucas (politician), member of the Indiana House of Representatives

See also